Vardan Adzemian (born 29 July 1984) is an Armenian football player who plays for Doxa Italia in the Coast Soccer League.

References

External links
 Player profile at MLS

1984 births
Living people
Footballers from Yerevan
Soviet emigrants to the United States
American people of Armenian descent
American soccer players
Expatriate footballers in Greece
Association football defenders
Sportspeople from Glendale, California
Portland Timbers (2001–2010) players
USL First Division players
Ventura County Fusion players
LA Galaxy players
USL League Two players
Panathinaikos F.C. players
AEK Athens F.C. players
San Gabriel Valley Highlanders players